List of abbeys and priories is a link list for any abbey or priory. , the Catholic Church has 3,600 abbeys and monasteries worldwide.

In Europe

Armenia
Akhtala Monastery
Gandzasar monastery
Geghard
Goshavank
Haghartsin Monastery
Haghpat Monastery
Kecharis Monastery
Khor Virap
Noravank
Sanahin Monastery
Sevanavank
Tatev Monastery

Austria
 List of Christian monasteries in Austria

Belgium 
 List of Christian monasteries in Belgium

Czechia 

 Břevnov Archabbey
 Emauzy Abbey
 Rajhrad Abbey
 Vyšší Brod
 many more

Denmark
 List of Christian monasteries in Denmark

Finland

Nådendal Abbey

France
 List of Christian religious houses in France

Georgia
Betania Monastery
Bodbe Monastery
David Gareja monastery complex
Gelati Monastery
Jvari (monastery)
Shio-Mgvime Monastery

Germany

Beuron Archabbey
Echenbrunn Abbey
Frauenburg
Maria Laach
Münsterschwarzach Abbey
Abbey of Prüm
Quedlinburg Abbey
St. Hildegard's Abbey, Eibingen im Rheingau

Hungary
Benedictine Abbey of Bakonybél
Benedictine Abbey of Pécsvárad
Benedictine Abbey of Tihany
Benedictine Archabbey of Pannonhalma, a territorial abbacy
Cistercian Abbey of Szentgotthárd
Franciscan Monastery of Baja
Majk Abbey
Zirc Abbey

Ireland (Republic Eire) 
 List of monastic houses in the Republic of Ireland

Italy
Abbey of Santa Giustina, Padua
Abbey of the Holy Spirit at Monte Morrone, Sulmona
Abbey of the Saviour, Abbadia San Salvatore
Badia Fiorentina, Florence
Basilica di San Zeno Abbey, Verona
Bobbio Abbey, Bobbio, a territorial abbacy
Camaldoli Monastery, Poppi
Casamari Abbey, Veroli
Certosa di Galluzzo, Galluzzo
Certosa di Padula, Salerno
Certosa di Pavia, Pavia
Cervara Abbey, Santa Margherita Ligure
Chiaravalle Abbey, Milan
Chiaravalle Abbey, Tolentino
Cistercian Abbey, Albino
Farfa Abbey, Fara Sabina, a territorial abbacy
Fonte Avellana, Serra Sant'Abbondio 
Fossanova Abbey, Priverno
Fruttuaria, San Benigno Canavese
Grottaferrata Abbey, Grottaferrata, the only Italo-Albanese territorial abbacy
Hermitage of Camaldoli, Naples
La Trinità della Cava, Cava de' Tirreni
Lucedio Abbey, Turin
Marienberg Abbey, Mals
Matris Domini Monastery, Bergamo 
Monastery of the Holy Saviour, Lecceto
Monte Cassino, Cassino, a territorial abbacy
Monte Oliveto Maggiore, Asciano
Nonantola Abbey, Nonantola
Novalesa Abbey, Val di Susa
Pomposa Abbey, Ferrara, a territorial abbacy
Säben Abbey, Klausen
Sacra di San Michele, Val di Susa
Sacro Convento, Assisi
San Clemente Abbey, Castiglione a Casauria
San Giorgio Monastery, Venice
San Giovanni degli Eremiti, Palermo
San Giovanni in Venere, Fossacesia
San Liberatore a Maiella, Serramonacesca
San Mercuriale, Forlì
San Miniato al Monte, Florence
San Pietro, Perugia, Perugia
San Pietro in Bovara, Bovara
San Pietro in Valle, Ferentillo
San Salvatore, Brescia, Brescia
San Vincenzo al Volturno, Castel San Vincenzo
San Vittore alle Chiuse, Genga
San Zeno (Pisa), Pisa
Sant'Anselmo, Rome 
Sant'Antimo Abbey, Montalcino
Abbey of Santa Lucia, Rocca di Cambio
Santa Maria Arabona, Manopello
Santa Maria Casanova, Villa Celiera
Santa Maria del Carmine, Florence
Santa Maria della Vittoria, Scurcola Marsicana
Santi Vito e Salvo, San Salvo
Santo Spirito d'Ocre, Ocre
Santo Stefano, Bologna 
Santo Stefano in Manciano, Manciano
Sassovivo Abbey, Foligno
Staffarda Abbey, Saluzzo
Tre Fontane Abbey, Rome
Vallombrosa Abbey, Reggello
Villa Magna, Anagni

Netherlands
Berne Abbey, Heeswijk
Egmond Abbey, Egmond-Binnen
Koningshoeven Abbey, Berkel-Enschot
Lilbosch Abbey, Echt
Middelburg Abbey, Middelburg
Rijnsburg Abbey, Rijnsburg
Rolduc Abbey, Kerkrade
Ruinen Abbey, Ruinen
Sion Abbey, Diepenveen
Stavoren Abbey, Stavoren
Susteren Abbey, Susteren
Thorn Abbey, Thorn
Ulingsheide Abbey, Tegelen
St. Benedictusberg Abbey, Vaals
St. Paul's Abbey, Utrecht
St. Willibrord's Abbey, Doetinchem

Norway
 List of Christian monasteries in Norway

Poland
 Kołbacz
 Cistercians Abbey in Sulejów
 Krzeszów Abbey
 Tyniec
 Jasna Góra Monastery
 Cistercians Abbey in Wąchock

Portugal
 Jerónimos Monastery

Russian Federation
 Troitse-Sergiyeva Lavra
 Chudov Monastery
 Simonov Monastery
 Novospassky Monastery
 Novodevichy Convent
 Borisoglebsky Monastery
 Ferapontov Monastery
 Kirillo-Belozersky Monastery
 Solovetsky Monastery
 Khutyn Monastery
 Ipatiev Monastery
 Valaam Monastery
 Danilov Monastery
 Andronikov Monastery
 Alexander Nevsky Monastery
 Marfo-Mariinsky Convent

Spain
Lluc Sanctuary, Majorca
Monasterio de Piedra, Zaragoza Province
Nuestra Señora de Rueda Monastery, Zaragoza Province
San Salvador of Leyre Abbey, Navarre
Santa María de El Paular Monastery, Madrid Province
Santa María de Montserrat Abbey, Barcelona Province
Santa María de Moreruela Abbey, Zamora Province
Santa María de Poblet Monastery, Tarragona Province
Santa María de Vallbona Monastery, Lleida Province
Santa María la Real de Fitero Monastery, Navarre
Santa María la Real de Las Huelgas Monastery, Burgos Province
Santo Domingo de Silos Abbey, Burgos Province
Suso Monastery, San Millán de la Cogolla, La Rioja Province
Yuso Monastery, San Millán de la Cogolla, La Rioja Province

Sweden
 List of Catholic monasteries and convents in Sweden

Switzerland
 List of Christian monasteries in Switzerland

United Kingdom
 List of monastic houses in England
 List of monastic houses on the Isle of Man
 List of monastic houses in Northern Ireland
 List of monastic houses in Scotland
 List of monastic houses in Wales

In Asia

Australia
 See List of monasteries in Australia

China

People's Republic 
 Yenki Abbey, Yenki (Yanji)

Hong Kong
 Our Lady of Joy Abbey (Trappist Haven Monastery), Lantau Island, New Territories

India
 St Michael's Priory, Kumily

Indonesia
 Rawaseneng Monastery, Temanggung
 Bunda Pemersatu Monastery, Gedono, Semarang
 Lamanabi Trappist Monastery, East Flores

Korea

North Korea
 St Benedict's Territorial Abbey, Tokwon

South Korea
 St Bernardo Tolomei Abbey, Goseong
 St Maurus and St Placidus Abbey, Waegwan

Philippines
 St Benedict's Conventual Priory, Digos
 Our Lady of Montserrat Abbey, Manila

Syria
 See Monasteries of Syria

Orthodox

Greek
Holy Transfiguration Monastery, Kferam, Homs
St. Elias (Deir Mar Elias), Sednaya
Mar Sarkis, Maaloula
Syriac
Holy Transfiguration Monastery, Kferam, Homs

In the Americas

Argentina
 Abadía de Cristo Rey, Tucumán
 Monasterio Benedictino Santa María, Los Toldos
 Abadía de San Benito, Luján
 Abadía del Niño Dios, Victoria

Canada
Saint Benedict Abbey, Quebec, Saint-Benoît-du-Lac, Quebec
 Abbey of Notre-Dame du Lac (Oka, Quebec)
 Ursulines of Quebec
 Canonesses of St. Augustine of the Mercy of Jesus
 Westminster Abbey, Mission, BC

United States

 Abbey of New Clairvaux, Vina, California
 Abbey of Our Lady of Gethsemani, Bardstown, Kentucky
 Abbey of Regina Laudis, Bethlehem, Connecticut
 Assumption Abbey, Richardton, North Dakota
 Belmont Abbey, Belmont, North Carolina
 Blue Cloud Abbey, Marvin, South Dakota
 Charterhouse of the Transfiguration, located on Mt. Equinox, outside Arlington, Vermont
 Christ the King Priory, Schuyler, Nebraska 
 Conception Abbey, Conception, Missouri
 Daylesford Abbey, Paoli, Pennsylvania
 Dominican House of Studies, Washington, D.C.
 Georgetown Visitation Monastery, Washington, D.C.
 Marmion Abbey, Aurora, Illinois
 Mepkin Abbey, Moncks Corner, South Carolina
 Monastery of Christ in the Desert, Abiquiú, New Mexico
 Monastery of Our Lady of the Annunciation of Clear Creek, Hulbert, Oklahoma
 Monastery of the Holy Spirit, Conyers, Georgia
 Monks of Mary, Sprague, Washington
 Mount Angel Abbey, Saint Benedict, Oregon
 Mount Michael Abbey, suburban Omaha, Nebraska
 Mount Saviour Monastery, Elmira, New York
 New Melleray Abbey, near Dubuque, Iowa.
  Our Lady of Dallas Abbey, Dallas, Texas
 Portsmouth Abbey, Portsmouth, Rhode Island
 Saint Anselm's Abbey, Washington, D.C.
 Saint Anselm Abbey, Goffstown, New Hampshire
 Saint Benedict Abbey, Still River, Massachusetts
 St. Bernard Abbey, Cullman, Alabama
 Saint Benedict's Abbey, Atchison, Kansas
 Saint Gregory's Abbey, Shawnee, Oklahoma
 Saint Gregory's Abbey, Three Rivers, Michigan
 Saint John's Abbey, Collegeville, Minnesota
 St. Joseph Abbey, Louisiana, Saint Benedict, Louisiana
 St. Joseph's Abbey, Massachusetts, Spencer, Massachusetts
 Saint Leo Abbey, Saint Leo, Florida
 Saint Louis Abbey, St. Louis, Missouri
 Saint Meinrad Archabbey, Spencer County, Indiana
 St. Michael's Abbey, Silverado, California
 St Paul's Abbey, Newton, New Jersey
 Saint Vincent Archabbey, Latrobe, Pennsylvania
 Subiaco Abbey and Academy, Subiaco, Arkansas

Venezuela
 St Joseph's Abbey, Güigüe

In Africa

Benin
 Mont Tabor de Hékanmè, Attogon

Burkina Faso
 Abbaye Saint-Benoît de Koubri, Koubri

Democratic Republic of the Congo
Monastery of St Odile, Malandji
Monastère Notre-Dame-des-Sources, Lubumbashi

Ivory Coast (Côte d'Ivoire)

 Monastère Bénédictin Sainte-Marie, Bouaké

Kenya
Prince of Peace Conventual Priory, Tigoni

Senegal
 Abbaye de Keur Moussa, Dakar

South Africa
Sacred Heart Abbey, Inkamana
St Benedict's Abbey, Pietersburg

Tanzania
St Maurus and St Placidus Abbey, Hanga
Our Lady Help of Christians Abbey, Ndanda

Togo
 Incarnation Conventual Priory, Agbang
 Abbaye de l'Ascension, Dzogbégan

Uganda
 Christ the King Priory, Tororo

Fictional abbeys
Redwall Abbey

See also 
 Territorial Abbacy 
 List of Catholic dioceses (alphabetical), with links to many related lists
 Lists of Christian monasteries
 Lists of Christian buildings and structures
 Index: Lists of buildings and structures

Notes

Abbeys and priories
Abbeys priories